El Observador is a Uruguayan newspaper, published for the first time on October 22, 1991, and distributed nationwide. Its circulation is verified by the Argentine institution IVC.

References

External links 

Official site

Newspapers published in Uruguay
Spanish-language newspapers
Publications established in 1991
1991 establishments in Uruguay
Mass media in Montevideo
Spanish-language websites